Lomonosovsky District is the name of several administrative and municipal districts in Russia. The districts are generally named for Mikhail Lomonosov, a Russian polymath.

Districts of the federal subjects
Lomonosovsky District, Leningrad Oblast, an administrative and municipal district of Leningrad Oblast
Lomonosovsky District, Moscow, a district in South-Western Administrative Okrug of Moscow

City divisions

Lomonosovsky Territorial Okrug, a territorial okrug of the city of Arkhangelsk, the administrative center of Arkhangelsk Oblast

Historical districts
Lomonosovsky District, a former district of the federal city of St. Petersburg; since 2003—a part of Petrodvortsovy District

See also
Lomonosov (disambiguation)

References